John E. Worthen (born July 15, 1933) was the 11th President of Ball State University and the 20th President of Indiana University of Pennsylvania.

Background
He married Sandra Damewood in 1960. She served as a member of the Delaware House of Representatives from 1973 to 1978, when she resigned to become special assistant for education to Governor Pete du Pont.

Worthen was president of Indiana University of Pennsylvania an administrative official at the University of Delaware as well as serving as the dean of men at American University. He worked at IUP from 1979–1984, and at Ball State from 1984-2000. Worthen earned a bachelor's degree from Northwestern University in psychology, a master's degree from Columbia University, and a Doctor of education degree from Harvard University.

Ball State University

John E. Worthen Arena 
In 1991, Ball State finished construction on University Arena to replace the aging facility, Irving Gymnasium. The arena holds 11,500 people and is home to the men and women's basketball and volleyball teams.

See also
 List of Ball State University Presidents
 John E. Worthen Arena

References

Northwestern University alumni
Columbia University alumni
Harvard Graduate School of Education alumni
Indiana University of Pennsylvania
University of Delaware people
Presidents of Ball State University
Living people
1933 births
People from Carbondale, Illinois